In the 1989–90 season, USM Alger is competing in the National for the 19th time, It is their 3rd consecutive season in the top flight of Algerian football. No Algerian Cup this season.

Squad list
Players and squad numbers last updated on 1 September 1989.Note: Flags indicate national team as has been defined under FIFA eligibility rules. Players may hold more than one non-FIFA nationality.

Competitions

Overview

Championnat National

League table

Results by round

Matches

African Cup Winners' Cup

Quarter-finals

Squad information

Playing statistics

|-

|-
! colspan=10 style=background:#dcdcdc; text-align:center| Players transferred out during the season

Goalscorers
Includes all competitive matches. The list is sorted alphabetically by surname when total goals are equal.

References

USM Alger seasons
Algerian football clubs 1989–90 season